A cartel is a tight organization based on a formal agreement among commercial enterprises with conflicting interests.

Cartel may also refer to:

Various cartels
 Cartel, adopted from Dutch language Kartel (electoral alliance), a public and formal electoral alliance between political parties (hence, cartel parties)
 Cartel party theory, evaluates influences among state and political parties (hence, cartel parties)
 Drug cartel, a drug trafficking organization (the article lists specific cartels)
 State cartel theory, addresses international relations formed by states (hence, cartel states)
 Cartel (intergovernmental agreement)

Music

Groups and labels
 Cartel (band), an American pop punk band
 Cartel (rap group), a Turkish hip hop group
 The Cartel (record distributor), a network of record distributors in the UK

Albums
 Cartel (Cartel album), the band's self-titled album
 Cartel (hip hop album), a German 1995 compilation album

Film
  Cartel (web series), a 2021 webseries on ALTBalaji
 Cartels (film), a 2017 action film starring Steven Seagal
 The Cartel, a 2010 documentary film by Bob Bowdon that covers the failures of public education in the United States by focusing on New Jersey

Other uses
 Cartel (concept), an ambiguous concept, which usually refers to a combination or agreement between rivals
 Cartel (intergovernmental agreement), spread throughout the 17th to 19th centuries in the Western world
 Cartel (ship), a vessel engaged in a humanitarian voyage, such as the exchange of prisoners
 Galindo cartel, a cartel that figured largely in Sons of Anarchy (season 4) and the spinoff series Mayans M.C.
 The Cartel, a professional-wrestling stable in the Global Wrestling Federation in the 1990s
  - historically, a written letter of defiance or  challenge

See also 
 Cartell, an Irish vehicle checking company
 El Cartel (disambiguation)
 Kartel (disambiguation)
 Kartellen, Swedish gangsta-rap and hip hop formation